Henry VIII is a 1911 British silent historical film directed by Will Barker and starring Arthur Bourchier, Herbert Tree and Violet Vanbrugh. It is based on William Shakespeare and John Fletcher's play Henry VIII. Tree was paid £1,000 for his role as Cardinal Wolsey which was revealed as part of the film's publicity. The writer Louis N. Parker was employed as an advisor regarding historical accuracy.

The film's success sparked a mini-boom in Shakespeare adaptations.

Cast

References

Bibliography
 Macnab, Geoffrey. Searching for Stars: Stardom and Screen Acting in British Cinema. Cassell, 2000.
 Oakley, Charles. Where We Came In: Seventy Years of the British Film Industry. Routledge, 2013.

External links

1911 films
1910s historical drama films
British silent feature films
British historical drama films
Films set in London
Films set in England
Films set in the 16th century
British black-and-white films
Films based on Henry VIII (play)
1911 drama films
1910s English-language films
1910s British films
Silent historical drama films